Cnesmocarpon is a genus of 4 species of rainforest trees known to science, constituting part of the plant family Sapindaceae.

They grow naturally in the rainforests of New Guinea and north eastern Queensland, Australia.

Species
 Cnesmocarpon dasyantha , Pink tamarind – Australia, New Guinea
 Synonyms: basionym: Guioa dasyantha ; Jagera dasyantha ; Jagera discolor 
 Cnesmocarpon dentata ,  – New Guinea
 Cnesmocarpon discoloroides ,  – New Guinea
 Cnesmocarpon montana ,  – New Guinea

References

Cited works
 

 

Sapindaceae
Sapindaceae genera